In enzymology, a [myelin-proteolipid] O-palmitoyltransferase is an enzyme that catalyzes the chemical reaction

palmitoyl-CoA + [myelin proteolipid]  CoA + O-palmitoyl-[myelin proteolipid]

Thus, the two substrates of this enzyme are palmitoyl-CoA and myelin proteolipid, whereas its two products are CoA and O-palmitoyl-myelin proteolipid.

This enzyme belongs to the family of transferases, specifically those acyltransferases transferring groups other than aminoacyl groups.  The systematic name of this enzyme class is palmitoyl-CoA:[myelin-proteolipid] O-palmitoyltransferase. Other names in common use include myelin PLP acyltransferase, acyl-protein synthetase, and myelin-proteolipid O-palmitoyltransferase.

References

 

EC 2.3.1
Enzymes of unknown structure
Enzymes